Rogelio Carbajal Tejada (born 29 October 1975) is a Mexican lawyer and politician from the National Action Party. From 2006 to 2009 he served as Deputy of the LX Legislature of the Mexican Congress representing Coahuila.

References

1975 births
Living people
People from Torreón
Universidad Iberoamericana alumni
National Action Party (Mexico) politicians
21st-century Mexican politicians
Deputies of the LX Legislature of Mexico
Members of the Chamber of Deputies (Mexico) for Coahuila